Ffrith railway station was a station in Ffrith, Flintshire, Wales. The station was opened on 2 May 1898 and closed on 27 March 1950.

References

Further reading

Disused railway stations in Flintshire
Railway stations in Great Britain opened in 1898
Railway stations in Great Britain closed in 1950
Former Great Western Railway stations
Former London and North Western Railway stations